Monarthrum is a genus of typical bark beetles in the family Curculionidae. There are about 5 described species in Monarthrum.

Species
 Monarthrum dentigerum Wood & Bright, 1992
 Monarthrum fasciatum Wood & Bright, 1992
 Monarthrum huachucae Wood, 1959
 Monarthrum mali Wood & Bright, 1992 (apple wood stainer)
 Monarthrum scutellare Wood & Bright, 1992

References

 Poole, Robert W., and Patricia Gentili, eds. (1996). "Coleoptera". Nomina Insecta Nearctica: A Check List of the Insects of North America, vol. 1: Coleoptera, Strepsiptera, 41-820.

Further reading

 Arnett, R. H. Jr., M. C. Thomas, P. E. Skelley and J. H. Frank. (eds.). (21 June 2002). American Beetles, Volume II: Polyphaga: Scarabaeoidea through Curculionoidea. CRC Press LLC, Boca Raton, Florida .
 
 Richard E. White. (1983). Peterson Field Guides: Beetles. Houghton Mifflin Company.

Scolytinae